Lorenzo 2015 CC. is the thirteenth studio album by Italian singer-songwriter Jovanotti, released by Universal Music on 24 February 2015.

The album was preceded by the single "Sabato", released on 16 December 2014, which reached number four on the FIMI Singles Chart.

Track listing

Musicians

Jovanotti – vocals, guitar
Saturnino – bass, drums
Riccardo Onori – guitar
Frank Santarnecchi – piano, keyboards
Christian "Noochie" Rigano – keyboards, programming, synth, sequencer
Michele Canova Iorfida – keyboards, synth
Alex Alessandroni Jr. – keyboards, piano, Hammond organ, Fender Rhodes
Roberto Baldi – keyboards
Money Mark – keyboards
Daru Jones – drums
Omar Hakim – drums
Mark Guiliana – drums
Solomon Sheppard – guitar

Tim Pierce – guitar
Tim Lefebvre – bass
Manu Dibango – sax, marimba
Antibalas – instruments 
Bombino – guitar
Sinkane – guitar
Tamer Pinarbasi – qanun
Max ZT – dulcimer
Gilmar Gomes – percussions
Gil Oliveira – percussions
Ronaldo Andrade – percussions, cavaquinho
Marco Tamburini – trumpet
Dario Cecchini – sax, flute
Roberto Rossi – trombone

Charts and certifications

Peak positions

Year-end charts

Certifications

See also
 List of best-selling albums by year (Italy)

References

2015 albums
Jovanotti albums
Universal Music Italy albums
Italian-language albums
Albums produced by Michele Canova